Vladimir Arkadievich Yeryomin (born 

September 6, 1950) is a Soviet and Russian actor, screenwriter and producer. Member of the Cinematogr0оплооррреооaphers' Union and the Union of Theatre Workers of the Russian Federation.

Biography 
Yeryomin was born on September 6, 1950 in the village of Muromtsevo, Omsk Oblast. In 1957-1967 he studied at the school in Pavlodar (Kazakhstan). Parents of the future actor had no relationship to the theater and cinema, but as a child, Vladimir became interested in circus and theater.

In 1968-1972, Vladimir Yeryomin studied at the  Nemirovich-Danchenko School-Studio  (Moscow Art Theater). In 1973-1979 - he played in the company of the Lermontov State Academic Russian Drama Theatre  in Almaty. Since 1982 - Tovstonogov Bolshoi Drama Theater. From 1995 to 1997 - an actor of the Moscow theater Satyricon, participates in the entreprise performances. Since 2014 - Artist of the Russian Army Theatre.

In 2014 he signed a letter against the annexation of the Republic of Crimea and Sevastopol to the Russian Federation.

Selected filmography
Moonzund (1987)
 The Criminal Quartet (1989)
 Afghan Breakdown (1991)
Dreams of Russia (1992)
House for the Rich (2000)
The Envy of Gods (2000)
 Fortress of War (2010, screenwriter)
Ivan Denisovich (2021)

References

External links

 Official site
И. А. Бунин, Окаянные дни. Читает Владимир Ерёмин URL at 9/7/2008

1950 births
Living people
Soviet male film actors
Soviet male voice actors
Soviet male stage actors
Male screenwriters
Soviet screenwriters
Russian male film actors
Russian male voice actors
Russian male television actors
Russian male stage actors
20th-century Russian screenwriters
20th-century Russian male writers
20th-century Russian male actors
21st-century Russian male actors
Moscow Art Theatre School alumni
People from Muromtsevsky District